The General Union of Syrian Women (GUSW) was founded in 1967 with Saud al Abdallah serving as the original president. It aimed to mobilize women while developing their education, political activism, and skills that helped women become more effective members in socio-economic settings. While Syrian women have historically held more rights when compared to the rest of the Arab world, the GUSW is working to put an end the isolation and marginalization of Syrian women as well as involve women to become more of an effective population in society. This movement was born out of the unification of various welfare associations, volunteer organizations, and welfare groups caused by various political shifts in Syria.

The women of Syria first gained the right to vote in 1953, but they were still not able to pass their citizenship to their children like the men Syria. In 1973, the Ba'ath Regime of Syria pursued equality for women in Syria by amending an article that created equality for all genders, thus removing all barriers to women's advancements. Although the regime expanded its control on freedom in Syria, it still did not encourage more female participation in the political spectrum. Article 25 of the Constitution states, "all the opportunities that enable them to participate fully and effectively in political, social, cultural, and economic life. The state works to remove the restrictions that prevent women's development and their participation in building socialist Arab society." The GUSW has since then successfully built an organization that pushes for the inclusion of women in Arab society.

Organization

Membership and structure 
The GUSW is not funded by the Syrian government but works closely with the government to promote equality of women. The GUSW has its own constitution, bylaws, and infrastructure outside of the government. They have made an effort to eliminate illiteracy among the women of Syria from the ages 6–12 to ensure that they can pursue their education when they grow up. The GUSW advocates for rights beyond equality; they also fight against terrorism and promote literacy for women across their country so that everyone can earn an education in Syria, and not just men.

The GUSW has also been praised by the Syrian Prime Minister for their work in advocating women's rights. The Prime Minister focused his attention on the part they play in the development of urban areas and their drive to pursue higher ranking status in organizations and fighting for their rights. Over 280,000 Syrian housewives are associated with the GUSW with over its different branches and a multitude of different associations to help promote their agenda of equality for women. The GUSW are an information, research, and training center to help teach and provide help for women in Syria.

Goals 
The GUSW strives to empower women and help address roadblocks that could hinder their achievements. In addition to activism raising awareness for women's health, legal, social, economic and political issues, they have a number of centers and work with organization to provide services to women directly. Some of the services that they provide include addressing issues with education and literacy, providing child care services and assisting with career and family planning.

Current activity 
The GUSW spurs activity of women in order to raise social, economic, political and cultural standards of living. A majority of the GUSW’s early recruits were women living in rural populations who were socially and economically oppressed by societal norms and traditions. Recruitment in the 1980s expanded from engaging women inside the privacy of the home to also utilizing public platforms and building a media presence. The GUSW continues to offer a variety of social services aimed to improve education, political awareness, and skills for all Syrian women.

According to President of the Union Soad Bakkur, the goal of the GUSW is to implement the ideas set forth by the National Syrian Women’s Strategy, whose core ideas were inspired by the 1995 Beijing World Conference on Women and the Arab Plan Action for Women. The GUSW currently operates 14 different branches of governorates, 114 associations, and 1850 centers. Bakkur is also working to open over 300 childcare centers to provide mothers with care for children while they pursue training that will increase family or personal income. The GUSW has a specific focus on providing women access to information on topics such as human rights, rural development, health, education, environment, food security, and finance.

The group has been affiliated with the Ministry of Health, United Nations Children's Fund, United Nations Population Fund, United Nation Development Fund for Women, United Nations Development Program, and the World Food Program. The GUSW has politically campaigned in opposition to the Israeli occupation of Palestine, the Israeli seizure of Golan Heights, and the war in South Lebanon.

History 
In 1963, the Ba’th Arab Socialist Party became the ruling party of Syria. The Ba’th’s own constitution aims for social and political reform, one of these reforms being an equality between women and men. Once the government made the reform program national in 1970, Islamic law and the secular views of the party began working hand in hand. Because of this, Syrian women’s rights were placed on the forefront. Syria is fairly ahead of other Arab countries with equal rights for women. As a result, The GUSW was formed to keep the issue of equality for women a priority. The GUSW was a newer formation of the Women's Union that had been formed before the Ba'th party gained control. To sum this up, in 1968, the Women's Union was included in the Ba'ath party structure as the GUSW.  However, because the GUSW is now tied to the Ba’th Party, it has an advantage over other women’s organizations who are not solidified by the legality that GUSW is. GUSW receives state funding from the Ba'th Party. Other organizations are considered illegal and struggle to make progress because they must do so in secrecy. Those organizations have trouble operating without the help of GUSW.

The GUSW’s past work includes fighting for literacy, and equipping women with skills to enter the workforce. Women who want to work to support their families but do not have the skills can take courses and training through the GUSW in order to be employable. Illiteracy is a large issue in Syria that GUSW addresses. When the GUSW was founded, 80 percent of women in rural areas were illiterate. By 1992, the total illiteracy rate was down immensely to only 30.6 percent. As of 2004, the GUSW had taken part in organizing 343 day care centers for children, as well as training centers for women in varying skill sets in each governorate of Syria.  The GUSW also took part in educating women about health, education, literacy, legal awareness, violence, and much more. Much of this work involves educating women about their rights so that they can take steps towards the equality that the Ba’th constitution ensures them.

Transnational efforts 
The GUSW has, on occasion, worked with groups from different states and has called upon the United Nations and European Union for action. In 2013 the group demonstrated via sit-in at the Damascus Quarters of the United Nations, along with fellow women's groups based in Palestine and Iraq, to speak out against the United States' calls for intervention. In 2011 the group petitioned the UN and EU to respond to terrorist attacks within the country and to the rape and murder of four girls by  terrorist groups. The GUSW used this protest to speak out against foreign powers that provided aid to rebel groups, whom the women identified as terrorists.  In the same year the group also worked with a delegation of Turkish women to aid them in dispelling rumors about Syria and to help the GUSW to work against foreign powers attempting to take control of the embattled country and undermine its sovereignty. These incidences demonstrate a continued anti-interventionist stance by the group and a promotion of the nation's ability to self-govern.

The GUSW called on UN Secretary General Ban Ki-moon in 2011 to act in response to reports of the rape of Syrian women in Turkish refugee camps, citing the Fourth Geneva Convention, article 27. As of March 2016 as many as two million Syrian women and children were living in Turkey and many of those face risk of sexual exploitation and harassment, due in part to Syrian refugee women's lack of resources. As of September 19, 2016, 193 members of the UN signed an agreement to organize a protocol for how states treat refugees with a goal of addressing sexual violence against these communities, among other objectives.

References

Women's organizations based in Syria